Tiya Pusit (born Myrna Villanueva; March 23, 1948 – October 2, 2014) was a Filipino movie and television actress and comedian. She is best known for her role in the 1980s sitcom Eh, Kasi Babae.

Personal life
Pusit was the sister of actress and comedian Nova Villa. In 2013, it was announced that she would be marrying her 27-year-old boyfriend in 2014. She has 4 children.

Career
Tiya Pusit was best known for comedic roles during her 30+ year career. She appeared in many movies, including Dorm Boys (2012), A Journey Home (2009), Bakit ba Ganyan (Ewan ko nga ba, Darling) (2000), Huwag na Huwag kang Lalapit Darling (1997) and Hulihin si…Nardong Toothpick (1990), and Leroy Leroy Sinta (1988).

Villanueva's final roles were in ABS-CBN's drama series Ikaw Lamang and the TV5 sitcom Confessions of a Torpe. She also had roles in DZBB-TV programs, GMA shows including Bahay Mo Ba 'To? (2005) One True Love (2012) and Akin Pa Rin ang Bukas (2013) and ABS-CBN dramas Momay (2010) and Mara Clara (2011).

Death
Pusit fell ill in April 2014, suffering from kidney failure and aortic aneurysm. She underwent double heart bypass surgery on September 9 but had difficulties recovering. She died due to multiple organ failure at the Philippine Heart Center in Quezon City on October 2, 2014.

Filmography

Film

Television

References

External links
 

1948 births
2014 deaths
People from Quezon City
Filipino film actresses
Filipino television actresses
Filipino women comedians
Deaths from multiple organ failure
Actresses from Metro Manila
GMA Network personalities
ABS-CBN personalities